The second USS Arkansas, was a single-turreted "New Navy" monitor and one of the last monitors built for the United States Navy. Arkansas was ordered on 4 May 1898 and awarded to Newport News Shipbuilding & Dry Dock Company on 11 October 1899. She was laid down just over a month later on 18 November 1899. Arkansas was launched almost a year later on 10 November 1900, sponsored by Bobbie N. Jones; but not commissioned for another two years, on 28 October 1902, with Commander Charles E. Vreeland in command.

This last class of monitors had been designed and built because of public demand for coastal defense before the Spanish–American War. By the time they were built and commissioned their purpose had passed. They didn't fit into the Navy's new purpose and so they bounced around from one different assignment to another. In 1909, the ship was renamed Ozark so that her name could be used for a new battleship. Ozark and her sisters were refitted as submarine tenders in 1913 because of their low freeboards.

Design

The s had been designed to combine a heavy striking power with easy concealment and negligible target area. She was manned by a total crew of 13 officers and 209 men.

Arkansas was powered by two vertical triple expansion engines driving two screw propellers with steam generated by four Thornycroft boilers.

The ship was armed with a main battery of two /40 caliber guns, either Mark 3 or Mark 4, in a Mark 4 turret. The secondary battery consisted of four /50 caliber Mark 7 guns along with three  Hotchkiss QF 6-pounder guns.

Construction

Background 
On May 4, 1898, the U.S. Congress passed the Naval Appropriations Act of 1898. The act included the appropriation of 5 million dollars to build a new class of four new Monitors for the Navy, each to cost a maximum of $1,250,000.  This came about from the call for more coastal defense vessels in the lead-up to and during the Spanish-American War. While the war with Spain almost guaranteed Congress would authorize their construction, as the act was passed less than two weeks after the war was declared, it would also be this conflict that nearly derailed the new monitors entirely. Less than a month after the ships were successfully contracted, reports were received from Rear Admiral William T. Sampson that sharply criticized the Monitors under his command in the lead-up to and during the Bombardment of San Juan. Sampson reported that the Monitors were inefficient due to their slow speed, which greatly hindered his operations, and he noted the poor accuracy of there guns, all of which convinced him operations would have gone smoother had the monitors not been sent out at all. 

In November, Secretary of the Navy John D. Long responded to the criticism by ordering all construction of the monitors to be halted while new changes were to be decided upon. Fortunately, the new ships were just beginning to be built, so any modifications wouldn't be hard to implement. In the end, very few changes would actually be made to the original designs with the biggest being a relatively slight increase in displacement and coal capacity, as well as lengthening the ship by another 30 feet.

Construction 
On October 1, 1898, bidding began on the construction of the new monitors, with the Newport News Shipbuilding and Dry Dock Company ultimately being contracted to build Arkansas for a price of $860,000, though this was later increased to $960,000 following the aforementioned changes to monitors design. Despite reports stating that she would be laid down in early 1899, construction wouldn’t begin on Arkansas until August of that year, with its keel being laid in November. Her sister ships, Florida, Wyoming, and Connecticut (later Nevada), had all begun being built much earlier, though the construction on these three would also be slow as all companies contracted had many other projects. Newport News Shipbuilding in particular had many ships in the process of being built, such as the pre-dreadnought battleships Kearsarge, Kentucky, Illinois, and Missouri, as well as six commercial vessels.

Launch 
A year after her keel was laid, she was launched at Newport News on November 10, 1900. Reportedly 5,000 people viewed the launch, which was attended by Governors Jones and Tyler, both of Arkansas and Virginia respectively. Bobbie Newton Jones, the daughter of the Arkansas Governor, sponsored the ship. Arkansas was released from the slipways at 11:33, and, as the ship slowly slid into the James  River, Ms. Jones proceeded to break the champagne bottle against the bow of the ship and stated, “I christen thee Arkansas.” Arkansas entered the water without “leaning starboard or port” according to one account, and the launch was a success.

Sea trials 
Construction of Arkansas would continue steadily throughout 1901, with the ship being described as roughly halfway completed by spring. Aside from a strike at the Newport News Shipyard in the summer, which resulted in extra guards being posted around the various ships in construction, including Arkansas, work would continue unabated for another year. On April 15, 1902, Arkansas underwent her first dock trial which was a success, with her machinery operating without any major problems. Her building test took place on July 17th, in which she was taken to the outskirts of the Virginia Capes for a few hours, and again all machinery was reported as working and the ship managed a speed slightly higher than the required 11 ½ knots. On August 6th, Arkansas had its official speed trial at the Barren Island course in the Chesapeake bay, averaging a speed of slightly over 12.2 knots for over an hour, surpassing the minimum speed needed for the trail by .7 knots.

Commissioning 
With the completion of all of her trials, Arkansas was turned over to the Navy on September 6 and taken to the Portsmouth Naval Yard where she arrived shortly thereafter. Arkansas was placed under the command of Charles E. Vreeland, who had been assigned to the ship in August to oversee its fitting. Prior to this Vreeland had served on a number of ships and was a member of the Board of Inspection and Survey, after which he became a commander. On October 28, 1902, Arkansas was officially commissioned into the United States Navy after a small ceremony in the afternoon, which ended with the American Flag being raised over the ship. Despite having her Keel laid down months after her sister ships she would be the first of the Arkansas-Class Monitors to enter the Navy.

Service history 
After shakedown, Arkansas first duty was with the US Naval Academy in 1902 as an instruction and cruise ship for midshipmen. She was then assigned to the Coast Squadron, North Atlantic Fleet, and cruised off the east coast, in the Gulf of Mexico, and in the West Indies from 1903 to 1906. In 1906 she was once again assigned to the Naval Academy for instructional purposes until 1909.

She was renamed Ozark, 2 March 1909, so her name could be used for the new battleship . She was assigned to the District of Columbia Naval Militia from 26 June 1910 until 6 March 1913, when she was recalled to the Norfolk Naval Yard to begin refitting, later that month, as a submarine tender. Ozark began her new duties as a tender on 12 July. In April 1914, Ozark participated in the United States occupation of Mexico, during the "Tampico Affair", which later made her sailors eligible for the Mexican Service Medal. On 13 October 1915, she arrived in New London, Connecticut, where the Navy established its first submarine base.

Ozark was ordered to SubDiv 6, Atlantic Fleet, 6 April 1917 and soon proceeded back to Tampico, Mexico where she cruised off the coast protecting American and Allied shipping interests. She sailed for New Orleans, 18 December 1918, after which she cruised off Key West, Central America and the Panama Canal Zone.

She returned to Hampton Roads 23 June 1919 and then on to Philadelphia, on 20 August, where she was decommissioned. When the US Navy went to two letter designators in 1920 she was redesignated BM-7 on 17 July. Ozark was sold on 26 January 1922 for scrapping.

Citations

General and cited references 
 
 
 
 
 
 
 
 
 

 Attribution

External links 

 World Battleships List: US "New Navy" Monitors
 U.S.S. Arkansas Scrapbook, 1902–1903, MS 187 held by Special Collections & Archives, Nimitz Library at the United States Naval Academy

1900 ships
Arkansas-class monitors
Ships built in Newport News, Virginia
United States Naval Academy
World War I monitors of the United States